This is a list of public utility electrical generating stations in Manitoba, Canada.

Manitoba produces close to 97% of its electricity through hydropower.  The most important hydroelectric development in Manitoba is the 3,955-megawatt Nelson River Hydroelectric Project. Its 5 power stations produced 27.4 terawatt-hours of electricity in 2014-2015, meeting 75.7% of the provincial demand.

Manitoba Hydro, the government-owned public utility is the main power generator in the province with 15 hydroelectric generating stations, 2 fossil-fuel plants and 4 diesel generators, for a total installed capacity of 5,701 MW.

Hydroelectric

Wind

The two wind farms in Manitoba are privately owned and sell energy to Manitoba Hydro for distribution to customers.

Fossil fuels

Off-grid
List of all Manitoba Hydro power plants in Manitoba serving loads in communities not connected to the North American power grid.

See also

 Energy in Canada
 List of power stations in Canada
 Nelson River DC Transmission System

Notes and references

Notes

References

Lists of power stations in Canada